Turtle Bay is located in the south of Bermuda.

Bays of Bermuda